Amoria maculata, common name Carol's volute, is a species of sea snail, a marine gastropod mollusk in the family Volutidae, the volutes.

Description
The shell is smooth and glossy, with a whorled, straight sided spire. The body whorl is smoothly rounded, with no shoulder. The columella has four thin, strong plaits, and the outer lip is smooth and not thickened. Typically, the shell ranges in colour between white, cream, fawn and salmon, occasionally without a pattern, but typically featuring four spiral bands of brown patches. Shell length varies, but is usually 60-80mm.

Distribution
This marine species occurs from Queensland to New South Wales, Australia.

References

 Bail P. & Limpus A. (2001) The genus Amoria. In: G.T. Poppe & K. Groh (eds) A conchological iconography. Hackenheim: Conchbooks. 50 pp., 93 pls

External links
 

Volutidae
Gastropods described in 1822